Harvington Hall is a moated medieval and Elizabethan manor house in the hamlet of Harvington in the civil parish of Chaddesley Corbett, south-east of Kidderminster in the English county of Worcestershire.

It is open to the public.

History
Harvington's moat and artificial island can be traced back to the 13th-century, older than the bulk of the 14th-century building work survives behind a layer of bricks. The Hall's centre block was probably the “solar” of a typical H-shaped timber-framed building.

Adam de Harvington (Herwynton), Chancellor of the Exchequer, lived and, probably, died there in March 1344. After his death, the estate was passed into the hands of the 11th Earl of Warwick and, in 1529, was sold to a wealthy lawyer, Sir John Pakington.

Sir John Pakington's great-nephew, Humphrey Pakington, inherited the estate in 1578, who transformed this manor with features that are most well known today.

Though the Hall's scale is large in the present day, it is currently only about half of its original size as two additional wings were demolished in around 1700.  The reasons of the demolition are untraceable now, but a clue of the size of the Hall was documented in 1595, which describes the Hall as "Humphrey’s Mansion House of Harvington".

Humphrey was a Catholic during the time of the harsh Elizabethan penal laws against Catholicism in England. Humphrey was a recusant, which means that he refused to abide by the practices of Church of England, such as attending the church service on Sundays, a refusal that was extremely costly financially. In 1585, it became illegal for a Catholic priest to set foot in England, which prompted Humphrey to construct numerous priest holes (or "priest hides") in the Hall for the protection of Catholic priests or followers. These priest holes have remained till today. Most notably, some of them were the handiwork of the master carpenter Nicholas Owen, a Jesuit lay brother.

Humphrey died in 1631 and left the Hall to his wife, Abigail, as the dower house. When Abigail died in 1657, she left the Hall to her daughter, Lady Mary Yate, who died in the Hall in 1696 at the age of 85, outliving her son and grandson.  The Hall was inherited by her granddaughter, another Mary Yate. Mary was married to Sir Robert Throckmorton of Coughton Court in Warwickshire, the son of Sir Francis Throckmorton. Sir Robert had little use for Harvington Hall and demolished two wings.  In the 19th and early 20th centuries, most of the furnishings were stripped, leaving Harvington in a bare and dilapidated state.

In 1923, Mrs. Ellen Ryan Ferris (1870–1955) purchased and gave Harvington Hall to the Archdiocese of Birmingham. Ferris is the mother of Robert Grant Ferris, who was Deputy Speaker of the House of Commons from 1970 to 1974 and later became Lord Harvington.

Gallery

See also
 Father Wall

References

Further reading

Country houses in Worcestershire
Historic house museums in Worcestershire
Grade I listed buildings in Worcestershire
Grade I listed houses
Elizabethan architecture
Houses completed in 1580
Roman Catholic Archdiocese of Birmingham